Gahnia sinuosa is a tussock-forming perennial in the family Cyperaceae, that is native to New Caledonia.

References

sinuosa
Plants described in 1975
Flora of New Caledonia